Johnston's Grocery Store, at 301 N. Picacho in Casa Grande, Arizona, is a historic building built around 1907.  It was listed on the National Register of Historic Places in 1985.

It was deemed significant for its use of adobe, which was rarely used for commercial buildings at the time of its construction.  The building first
served as a grocery store until 1932, first operated by Johnston and then by Wong Hong Chin.  It was later home of Sofia's Mexican Chicken.

It was owned from 1920 to 1935 by George Washington Johnston.

Notes

References

National Register of Historic Places in Pinal County, Arizona
Commercial buildings completed in 1907
Buildings and structures in Casa Grande, Arizona
Retail buildings in Arizona
Grocery store buildings
1907 establishments in Arizona Territory